George Alfred Barnard (23 September 1915 – 9 August 2002) was a British statistician known particularly for his work on the foundations of statistics and on quality control.

Early life and education
George Barnard was born in Walthamstow, London. His father was a cabinet maker and his mother had been a domestic servant. His sister Dorothy Wedderburn became a sociologist and eventually Principal of Royal Holloway, University of London. Barnard attended the local grammar school, the Monoux School, and from there he won a scholarship to St John's College, Cambridge, to read mathematics. In 1937 he went on to Princeton University to do graduate work on mathematical logic with Alonzo Church.

Career
Barnard was on holiday in Britain when the Second World War started and he never went back to Princeton to finish his PhD. The war made Barnard into a statistician as it did for many mathematicians of his generation. In 1940 he joined an engineering firm, Plessey, as a mathematical consultant. In 1942 he moved to the Ministry of Supply to apply quality control and sampling methods to the products for which they were responsible. It was there that Barnard began doing statistics. The group he was put in charge of included Peter Armitage, Dennis Lindley and Robin Plackett. Lindley recalls that they were like students working for a doctorate with Barnard as supervisor. Abraham Wald was in a similar group in the United States. Both groups developed sequential methods of sampling.

At the end of the war, Barnard went to Imperial College London, as a lecturer, becoming a reader in 1948 and professor of mathematical statistics in 1954. In 1961 he was elected as a Fellow of the American Statistical Association. In 1966 he moved to the newly created University of Essex, from which he retired in 1975. Barnard, however, kept on doing statistics until he died aged 86. Until 1981 he spent much of each year at the University of Waterloo, Canada, and after that he continued writing papers and corresponding with colleagues all over the world.

Barnard's best known contribution is probably his 1962 paper on likelihood inference but the paper he thought his best was the 1949 paper in which he first espoused the likelihood principle. He had originally described the principle in the context of optional stopping. A statement by Leonard Savage brings out how surprising the principle first seemed:
I learned the stopping rule principle from Professor Barnard in ... 1952. Frankly, I then thought it a scandal that anyone in the profession could advance an idea so patently wrong, even as today I can scarcely believe that some people resist an idea so patently right.

Political activism
In an interview Barnard recalled, "my main interest above everything was politics from about 1933 until 1956. Well, that’s not true – until the end of the war it would be fair to say." At school he proposed the motion to the school debating society that "Socialism is preferable to Capitalism." He joined the Communist Party in 1933 and took part in anti-fascist marches in the east end of London. The historian Eric Hobsbawm, a fellow communist at Cambridge, recalled him as a "lean-and-hungry-looking mathematician from a working class family" who served as the "student Party's chief local commissar." At Plessey he was chairman of the shop stewards.

Awards
Barnard served terms as president of three societies: Operational Research Society in 1962–1964, the Institute of Mathematics and its Applications in 1970–1971, and the Royal Statistical Society in 1971–1972. He was awarded the Guy Medal in Gold by the Royal Statistical Society in 1975.

In May 1986, Barnard was awarded an honorary degree by the Open University as Doctor of the university, and in 1994 he was awarded an honorary doctorate by the University of Essex.

Personal life
He married first, Helen J.B. Davis in 1942 and they had three sons. He married second, Mary M.L. Jones in 1949 and they had one son. He was a Distinguished Supporter of the British Humanist Association.

Barnard died at his home in Essex in August 2002. Dennis Lindley, writing in The Statistician, remarked that "We have lost a great statistician and a delightful human being."

Publications

 – This contains a review of Barnard's work by Lindley. The volume was one of a series honouring Bayesian heroes. There is a bibliography (citing 109 articles) up to 1989.

In 1990 he made a book out of manuscripts left by his friend Egon Pearson:

After 1990 Barnard published little, although he kept up his letter writing. In 1996 however he produced a review of Barndorff-Nielsen and Cox after observing that, "A great virtue of the book is that it raises perhaps as many questions as it answers," Barnard went on to give his answer to one of those questions:

See also
Barnardisation
 List of University of Waterloo people

References

External links

 – Briefer obituary
 on the page 
 – Barnard's correspondence with Fisher
 – Barnard the school debater
 – Barnard the PhD supervisor
 – Barnard the letter writer

1915 births
2002 deaths
People from Walthamstow
Alumni of St John's College, Cambridge
English statisticians
Academics of Imperial College London
Academics of the University of Essex
Communist Party of Great Britain members
Presidents of the Royal Statistical Society
People educated at Sir George Monoux College
Fellows of the American Statistical Association
Princeton University alumni
British expatriates in the United States
Academic staff of the University of Waterloo
Mathematical statisticians